Zembîlfiroş is a work by Kurdish writer and poet Faqi Tayran. It is believed to be based on a true story, transmitted from generation to generation through oral tradition, and is part of Kurdish mythology.

Summary 
The plot revolves around Prince Saed, son of Prince Hassan who ruled Farqîn near Diyarbakır. Prince Hassan was an evil governor and disliked by Prince Saed who migrated from Diyarbakır southward to Zakho. There he remained and began selling baskets.

Gallery

See also 
Grave of Zembil Firosh

References

Zakho
Kurdish folklore
Kurdish mythology
Kurdish literature
17th-century literature
Kurdish words and phrases